Amravati railway station serves Amravati in Amravati district in the Indian state of Maharashtra. It is linked to Badnera railway station on the Howrah–Nagpur–Mumbai line. This is a terminal station. Train for Mumbai, Pune, Tirupati, Jabalpur, Surat, Nagpur originates from Amravati. It is one of the three railway stations of Amravati city.

History
The first train in India travelled from Mumbai to Thane on 16 April 1853. By May 1854, Great Indian Peninsula Railway's Bombay–Thane line was extended to Kalyan. Bhusawal railway station was set up in 1860 and in 1867 the GIPR branch line was extended to Nagpur.

The -long  broad gauge Badnera–Narkhed line was completed in 2012. New Amravati railway station is on the new track.

Electrification
Railways in the Amravati area were electrified in 1993–94. The 2 km-long Amravati chord line was electrified in 2011–2012.

Amenities
Amravati railway station has total 4 platforms. Amenities at Amravati railway station include: computerised reservation office and waiting room.

Trains 
Important trains departing Amravati Terminal:

Express 

 02118/02117 Pune–Amravati Express
 02112/02111 Mumbai–Amravati Express
 02766/02765 Tirupati–Amravati Express
 09126/09125 Surat–Amravati Express

Passenger 

 Badnera–Amravati Shuttle.
 Amravati–Wardha Passenger.
 Nagpur–Amravati Passenger.

References

External links
Trains at Amravati
 

Railway stations in Amravati district
Transport in Amravati
Bhusawal railway division